The 2009 CAA men's basketball tournament was held from March 6–9, 2009.  It was won by the VCU Rams.

Bracket

Honors

Notable games in the tournament

First round
 #5 Hofstra defeated #12 UNC-Wilmington, 79–66. The game was played on March 6; the last time these two teams met in the Coliseum, UNCW won the CAA Championship over Hofstra, 78–67, on March 6, 2006. The final scores were only 2 points off.

Quarterfinals
 #11 Towson defeated #3 Northeastern, 58–54, in one of the greatest upsets in CAA tournament history. Never had a #11 seed even won a game in the tournament, and now Towson had won two straight.

Semifinals
 #1 VCU defeated #4 Old Dominion 61–53 in the rubber match between the two in-state rivals.

Championship game
 VCU won its 3rd championship in 6 seasons, all of them coming against George Mason. VCU's victory marked the largest score gap in the championship's history. Thousands of people stormed the Richmond Coliseum court after the final buzzer.

References

-2009 CAA men's basketball tournament
Colonial Athletic Association men's basketball tournament
CAA men's basketball tournament
CAA men's basketball tournament
Basketball competitions in Richmond, Virginia
College basketball tournaments in Virginia